Claude Andre Gregory (born December 26, 1958) is an American former professional basketball player from Washington, D.C..  He was a 6'8" (203 cm) 205 lb (93 kg) power forward.

College career
Gregory played college basketball for the Wisconsin Badgers.

Professional career
Gregory was selected by the Washington Bullets, with the 18th pick in the 2nd round, of the 1981 NBA draft. Gregory played for two National Basketball Association (NBA) teams. He played only two games for the Bullets in the 1985–86 season, and did not return to the league until the 1987–88 season, when he played in 23 contests for the Los Angeles Clippers, averaging 5.8 points and 3.9 rebounds per game.

References

External links
NBA stats @ basketballreference.com

1958 births
Living people
American expatriate basketball people in France
American expatriate basketball people in Italy
American expatriate basketball people in Spain
American men's basketball players
Basketball players from Washington, D.C.
CB Breogán players
CB Zaragoza players
Élan Béarnais players
Evansville Thunder players
La Crosse Catbirds players
Liga ACB players
Los Angeles Clippers players
Pallacanestro Reggiana players
Saski Baskonia players
Small forwards
Washington Bullets draft picks
Washington Bullets players
Wisconsin Badgers men's basketball players